Bir Türk'e Gönül Verdim is a 1969 Turkish adventure film, directed by Halit Refiğ and starring Eva Bender, Ahmet Mekin and Bilal İnci.

References

External links
Bir Türk'e Gönül Verdim at the Internet Movie Database

1969 films
Turkish adventure films
1969 adventure films
Films directed by Halit Refiğ